The houndfish (Tylosurus crocodilus) is a game fish of the family Belonidae. It is also often called the crocodile needlefish.

Description
While the houndfish has no spines, its  dorsal fin has 21–25 soft rays, and its anal fin has 19–22. They are also known to have 80–86 vertebrae. A key way of distinguishing the houndfish from other members of the genus Tylosurus is that the houndfish's teeth point anteriorly when the fish is a juvenile. The teeth of other species are straight at all ages. The houndfish also has a more stout, cylindrical body and a shorter head than other needlefishes. They have dark blue backs and silver-white sides and are plain white ventrally. A houndfish has a distinct keel on the caudal peduncle, and the caudal fin itself is deeply forked. Juvenile houndfish possess an elevated, black lobe on the posterior of their dorsal fins.

Taxonomy
Two subspecies of the houndfish were recognised:

Tylosurus crocodilus crocodilus (Péron & Lesueur 1821)
Tylosurus crocodilus fodiator Jordan & Gilbert 1882

However, Fishbase now recognises T.c. fodiator as a valid species, Tylosurus fodiator, the Mexican needlefish.

The houndfish was described as Belona crocodila by François Péron and Charles Alexandre Lesueur in 1821 with the type locality given as Mauritius.

Distribution and habitat

In the Indian and Pacific Oceans, houndfish are found in the Red Sea and from the coast of South Africa, east to French Polynesia, and north to Japan, and south to New South Wales, Australia. The houndfish is replaced by the Mexican needlefish, in the eastern Pacific. Houndfish are known from New Jersey to Brazil in the west Atlantic, and in the east, they are found from Fernando Poo, Cameroon, and Liberia to Ascension Island. Houndfish can also be found near Guinea, Senegal and Cape Verde. It has been recorded in the eastern Mediterranean Sea, having moved from the Red Sea via the Suez Canal as part of the Lessepsian migration.

A pelagic animal, houndfish can be found over lagoons and seaward reefs either as individuals or small groups, where they feed mainly on smaller fishes. Houndfish lay eggs which attach themselves to objects in the water via tendrils on the surface of each egg

Relationship to humans

Houndfish are considered to be gamefish, and can be caught by use of artificial lights, in a similar manner to other needlefishes. Although houndfish are considered good to eat, and are usually sold fresh, the market for them is small because their flesh has a greenish colour similar to that of the flat needlefish. The IGFA world record stands at 4.88 kg (10 lbs 12 oz) and was caught off Goulding Cay, Bahamas in 2013 by angler Daniel John Leonard using a live pilchard as bait.

Houndfish are considered to be dangerous, and are feared by fishermen because of their size and tendency to leap out of the water, causing puncture wounds with their beaks, when frightened or attracted to the lights used to catch them. In April 2000, a woman snorkeling in the Florida Keys was severely injured when she was stabbed in the neck by a houndfish that leapt out of the water. In October, 2010 an ocean-kayaker was injured when she was struck in the back (and was treated for a collapsed lung) by the beak of a houndfish that jumped out of the water near her boat.

References

External links

Discoverlife.org
zipcodezoo
ITIS
Fishbase on T. c. crocodilus
Fisbase on T. c. fodiator
WhatsThatFish.com
Leaping fish spears kayaker off Florida Keys: 10/18/10

Tylosurus
Pantropical fish
Taxa named by François Péron
Taxa named by Charles Alexandre Lesueur
Fish described in 1821